The Düssi (or Piz Git) is a mountain in the Glarus Alps in central Switzerland, located on the border between the cantons of Uri and Graubünden. Its massif separates the valleys of Maderanertal (Uri) and Val Russein (Graubünden). The summit (3,256 metres) is also named Gross Düssi to distinguish it from a lower summit to the south named Chli Düssi (3,125 metres) .

The Düssi is surrounded by glaciers, the Ober Hüfifirn on its northern side. The largest on its south-eastern side (in Graubünden) is the Glatscher da Cavrein.

References

External links
Gross Düssi on Summitpost
Düssi on Hikr

Mountains of the Alps
Alpine three-thousanders
Mountains of Switzerland
Mountains of Graubünden
Disentis
Mountains of the canton of Uri
Graubünden–Uri border